Robert Vincent Salazar Jaworski Sr. (born March 8, 1946) is a Filipino former professional basketball player, head coach and politician who served as a Senator of the Philippines from 1998 to 2004. He played 23 seasons in the Philippine Basketball Association. He is widely regarded as one of the best and most popular PBA players of all-time. He was named part of the PBA's 40 Greatest Players and was inducted into the PBA Hall of Fame in 2005.

Early life and college career
Born to an American father of Polish descent, Theodore Vincent Jaworski and a Filipino mother of Ilocano descent, Iluminada Bautista Salazar. Jaworski grew up in the streets of Manila where he was first introduced to basketball, rising to prominence in the collegiate leagues, where in 1964, he played for the University of the East Red Warriors in the University Athletic Association of the Philippines (UAAP). Jaworski delivered outstanding performances in the 1965 and 1966 UAAP seasons resulting in back-to-back titles for the Recto-based Red Warriors.

In 1966, Jaworski was part of the amateur selection sent to represent the country in the 1966 Bangkok Asian Games. The following year, he represented the country in the Asian Basketball Championship (now FIBA Asia Cup) in Seoul, South Korea where the Jaworski-led Philippine team won the gold medal at the expense of the host country.

Amateur career
In 1967, he joined the Elizalde-owned YCO Painters under coach Carlos Loyzaga. He played for YCO during the 1967 National Seniors and National Invitational (both won by YCO). He transferred to the newly formed Meralco Reddy Kilowatts in 1968 but was unable to play due to lack of release papers. He finally suited up for Meralco in 1970. His first MVP award was during the Presidential Cup of 1970.

In 1971, he and Alberto "Big Boy" Reynoso were banned for life by the Basketball Association of the Philippines (BAP) for assaulting two basketball officials, Eriberto Cruz and Jose Obias, who were ostensibly making a series of bad calls that seemingly favored the Crispa-Floro team. Reynoso and Jaworski chased the two officials on the court and mauled them in front of the crowd. Meralco was behind 65–50 against the Redmanizers. Meralco disbanded the team shortly afterwards. The two sure shoo-ins for the RP team to the 1972 Olympics missed the national team for the first time in their lives. Owing to the talent that the two players possessed, both players were reinstated in 1973 and played for Meralco for the final time during an exhibition match against the Japanese national team, which they won. The two later on teamed up in the Philippine national team for the 1973 ABC Championship. Jaworski was the lead guard of that team alongside Reynoso, Francis Arnaiz, Ramon Fernandez and William "Bogs" Adornado. Other players in that team included Rogelio "Tembong" Melencio, David "Dave" Regullano, Rosalio "Yoyong" Martirez, Manuel "Manny" Paner, Alberto "Abet" Guidaben, Jaime "Jimmy" Mariano and Ricardo "Joy" Cleofas.

It was also around this time when the nickname "Big J" was given to him by play-by-play commentarist Willie Hernandez, resembling the "Big O" tag given to Oscar Robertson who Jaworski played like.

Jaworski and Reynoso, with other former Meralco players, Fort Acuña, Francis Arnaiz and Orlando Bauzon formed the core of the newly formed Komatsu Komets (later renamed the Toyota Comets). Jaworski became a court general and led the Comets to the 1973 MICAA title. Reynoso, Jaworski and Armaiz made it to the 1973 and 1974 RP teams that regained the ABC crown and went to the 1974 FIBA World Championship.

Jaworski became a PBA player in 1975 after the Toyota Comets became one of the league's founding franchises when the league was formed the same year. Jaworski had for his original teammates Arnaiz, Reynoso, Fernandez, Reynoso's younger brother Cristino (Tino), Rodolfo "Ompong" Segura, Oscar Rocha, Joaquin "Jake" Rojas, and Orlando "Orly" Bauzon.

Professional career

Toyota (1973–1984)
Jaworski was part of the Toyota franchise for 10 years (1973–1983). He was the acknowledged leader of the team and a major player in Toyota's nine PBA championships. He was named Most Valuable Player in 1978. Jaworski's MVP performance may arguably be considered as his best single season, averaging 20 points, 12 assists and close to nine rebounds per game. This was done despite the presence of hulking imports with no height limit – imports he played alongside and against with. The closest that would compete for domination would be Ramon Fernandez's scintillating 1984 season for Beer Hausen where "El Presidente" averaged 27 points, 15 boards and 9.9 assists per game. The difference though was that Jaworski (along with Fernandez and Arnaiz) led the Toyota team to two championships that season (the Open and the AFC) while Fernandez failed to bag a title for Beer Hausen in 1984.

He was also the first point guard to achieve 1000 offensive and 2000 defensive rebounds. He is also the PBA's All Time Leader in Assists.

In 1967, Jaworski and veteran internationalist Narciso Bernardo were named as members of the Mythical Five.

Ginebra San Miguel (1984–1998)
When Toyota disbanded at the end of the 1983 season, the team was sold to Basic Holdings, Inc., the company that owns Asia Brewery. Jaworski balked at the idea of joining Beer Hausen, the brand name of Basic Holdings after describing what he felt was a sale done without giving due respect to the personalities involved. Jaworski described the sale as a 'farce,' and that players like him should not be sold "por kilo." At that time, Beer Hausen was intent on making Fernandez as the franchise player of the team with Jaworski relegated in the background. Eventually, then PBA president Carlos "Honeyboy" Palanca III made a decision that was the most controversial and history-making move in the PBA. Palanca, owner of La Tondeña, Inc. which owns Gilbey's Gin (later Ginebra San Miguel) in the PBA, decided to take in Jaworski and best buddy Arnaiz to the team. This marked the cornerstone in making Ginebra arguably the most popular team in Philippine basketball history with Jaworski at the forefront.

Jaworski and Arnaiz turned the moribund franchise into a competitive one almost overnight when in the first conference of the 1984 season, the All Filipino, they led the team to a runnerup finish against powerhouse Crispa. Gilbey's Gin was then led by Arturo "Turo" Valenzona, a former nemesis of Jaworski from their MICAA days. A power struggle was already ensuing thereby leading to the breakup of the Valenzona-Jaworski partnership at the start of the 1985 season. Jaworski took over as playing coach of Ginebra San Miguel while Valenzona went on limbo before moving to the Tanduay Rhum Makers in the 1986 season.

Jaworski's first championship as a playing coach came in the 1986 Open Conference when he, alongside import players Michael Hackett and Billy Ray Bates, dominated the entire conference to win the championship finals at the expense of the Manila Beer team, then led by former Crispa players Abet Guidaben (who was traded from Tanduay vice Fernandez) and Atoy Co, alongside imports Michael Young and Harold Keeling.

In Game 4 of that Best of Seven series, Jaworski played the entire game that needed two extra overtime periods to beat Manila Beer 145–135, thereby taking a 3–1 lead. Jaworski was 40 years old at that time and yet became a PBA record holder for being the local who played the longest in one game, later to be broken by Jaworski's wedding godson, Zandro "Jun" Limpot while playing for the Sta. Lucia Realtors as a rookie in 1993 by playing 60 minutes in a triple OT victory against SMB. Ironically, Jaworski also owns the PBA record for playing the shortest time in a PBA game, at one second. In a game against the Alaska Milkmen in 1996 and behind by two points with one second in that game, the Big J fielded himself to handle the inbound. While the inbound was successful, the team failed to convert this into a basket and lost the game.

In 1988, Jaworski won his first and only All Filipino championship in a controversial championship against Purefoods Hotdogs, led by Ramon Fernandez who also coached the team in the previous (Open) conference before relinquishing the job to Cris Calilan early in the All Filipino conference. Jaworski and Fernandez were involved in a running feud dating back when Toyota disbanded in 1983 and this became the climax of their rift. In Game 1 of that finals, Anejo Rum 65 upended Purefoods to gain initial lead in the series. Purefoods owner Jaime Zobel De Ayala and president Renato Buhain publicly accused Fernandez of not playing up to par in Game 1 and ordered his benching for the entire series. Because of this controversy, Anejo Rum went on to win the series, 3–1, including the deciding Game 4 where Jaworski became best player of the game – topscoring for his team with 28 points.

In 1989, Jaworski and Fernandez eventually reconciled, ending a long feud. Ironically, it was Baby Dalupan, coach of their archrival Crispa team that made it possible. Dalupan, then coaching the Veterans team of Jaworski and Fernandez in the 1989 All Star Game against the Rookies and Sophomore team, encouraged the two to shake hands after the game where both of them led the Veterans Team to victory by two points, 132–130, over the Rookies, Sophomores and Juniors (RSJ) Team. In the final 4 seconds of that game, Jaworski inbounded the ball and gave the pass to Fernandez who streaked past Benjie Paras and made a twisting "elegant" shot for the two point win. Jaworski, after being appointed national team coach by the BAP, later selected Fernandez in the team to represent the Philippines in the 1990 Asian Games in Beijing, China. Fernandez was among 12 players personally chosen by Jaworski to lead the charge for the team – others included Alvin Patrimonio, Allan Caidic, Samboy Lim, Yves Dignadice, Hector Calma, Benjie Paras, Ronnie Magsanoc, Zaldy Realubit and the Big J's players with Anejo – Dante Gonzalgo, Chito Loyzaga and Rey Cuenco. This team salvaged the silver medal against host China but not after giving the Chinese a good fight in the finals, losing 90–76.

In 1991, Jaworski won his third title at the expense of Formula Shell in Game 7 of the Open Conference. In that deciding game, Jaworski inbounded from the endline to Rudy Distrito with 4 seconds remaining. Distrito made a difficult, twisting, off-balanced and falling shot over the outstretched arms of Paras to pull off a two-point win and to the delight of millions of Ginebra fans watching the game. Jaworski ended up once more as the best player of that game with 13 points, 7 rebounds and 8 feeds in an all-around effort not common for a 45-year-old man. This marked the first time in the history of the PBA that a team came back from a 3–1 deficit to win the championship.

From 1992 to 1995, Ginebra suffered a drought owing to budgetary constraints experienced by the franchise. Jaworski worked with veterans and rookie players alike in trying to earn respectability during this period. In 1995, a PBA record was established when Jaworski took in his eldest son Robert Jaworski, Jr. in the second round of the rookie draft, making this the only time when a father and son played for the same team. However, the two never got to play together as Jaworski contented himself coaching the team while Robert Jr. got his few minutes as a starter.

It was in 1996 when the breakthrough came in for Ginebra, now called Ginebra Na! After years of savoring for super rookie Marlou Aquino, he finally got the 6'9 beanpole as top draft pick of 1996. He also got Bal David from the free agent ranks after the latter displayed capability as a point guard when he and Aquino led the national team to the gold medal in the 1995 SEA Games. David was also the celebrated point guard of the PBL, leading the Stag team to twin championships in 1995. But 1996 was Alaska's year – and the grandslam was accomplished with Gordon's Gin at the losing end in the 3rd and final conference. In 1997 though, Jaworski finally earned his 4th jewel, mentoring the team to the 1997 Commissioner's Cup championship at the expense of the Alaska Milkmen. The team won in 6 games, including a 126–94 rout in the final game.

Jaworski remained as coach of the team until April 1998 when he announced his intention of running for the Philippine Senate in May that year. Jaworski wound up 8th overall in the Senate race, making him one of the few cagers to become a Senator of the Republic – following the footsteps of Ambrosio Padilla and Freddie Webb. Fernandez tried to run for the Senate in the 1995 elections but wound up 19th overall.

After being proclaimed Senator, Jaworski turned over the coaching chores to his long-time assistant Quirino "Rino" Salazar while taking a leave of absence from the basketball scene. But in 1999, a controversy erupted when Ginebra owner Eduardo "Danding" Cojuangco, Jr. announced the promotion of Allan Caidic as playing assistant coach of Jaworski in Ginebra. The Big J didn't take this well and resigned from his position as head coach after feeling insulted of not being informed about it beforehand. Salazar took over and later on handed the reins to Caidic when he had to migrate to Alaska and join his family.

Jaworski's last game in the PBA was in March 1997 in a game held at Dumaguete City. He did not play much in that game but owns the record for being the oldest player ever to play in the PBA at 50 years old. This on top of being acknowledged as the league's most popular player and an influential figure in Philippine basketball.

On May 30, 2003, 23 years after the end of the Crispa-Toyota rivalry, Jaworski made an appearance at a reunion game in the Araneta Coliseum, alongside fellow players from both teams. Toyota beat Crispa in that reunion game, 65–62.

Political career
Jaworski successfully ran for Senator during the May 11, 1998, national elections as a candidate for Pwersa ng Masang Pilipino. Jaworski placed ninth overall in the senatorial election, the highest-placed finish for a former sportsman (after Tito Sotto, a former bowler), until Manny Pacquiao placed seventh in 2016.  Due to this, he was forced to leave the coaching chores to Ginebra assistant Rino Salazar. After an undisclosed dispute with the new management of San Miguel Corporation (Ginebra's parent company), Jaworski quit his duties as head coach and concentrated more on his political duties. During his stint as senator, Jaworski focused on legislating laws on environment and sports. He was chairman of the Economic Affairs, Trade and Commerce Committee and was also a member of the Games and Amusement and Sports Committee.

Among more than 300 bills he had authored or co-authored, Jaworski is most proud of eventual laws that:
 declared the Mount Kitanglad Range in the province of Bukidnon a protected area;
 established the Northern Sierra Madre Mountain Range in Isabela as a protected area;
 established the Batanes Group of Islands as a protected area;
 established Mount Kanlaon as a protected area, to the consternation of logging companies, and
 regulated the ownership, possession and sale of chainsaws. 

Jaworski also introduced legislation to protect the country's national marine sanctuaries and filed a bill imposing strict penalties on oil pollution damage on Philippine waters. He co-authored the Clean Air Act and the Ecological Solid Waste Management Act.

Jaworski unsuccessfully ran for re-election in the 2004 Philippine Senate election, placing 17th overall.

PBA logo 
Taking a cue from the NBA logo which was inspired from a photo of a dribbling Jerry West, the PBA updated its logo in 1993 to feature Jaworski's silhouette in a dribbling pose.

PBA return
The Philippine Daily Inquirer and the Manila Times reported on February 13, 2007, of Jaworski's possible return in the PBA as coach for either the Air21 Express or the Talk 'N Text Phone Pals for the 2007 PBA Fiesta Conference but declined to accept the offer since talks stalled before any contract offer was made.

After the tournament, talks resurfaced again between Jaworski and the Air21 management.

However, with the resignation of Noli Eala as league commissioner, Jaworski was one of the names mentioned as replacements for the said post although no offer had been made.

In the end though, Jaworski did not accept either offer and chose to retire from the public eye with his family.

Career highlights

 PBA Hall of Fame Class of 2005
 PBA Most Valuable Player (1978)
 PBA Mythical First Team Selection (1977, 1978, 1979, 1980, 1981 and 1986)
 PBA Mythical Second Team Selection (1985 and 1988)
 PBA All Defensive Team (1985 and 1988)
 Four time PBA All-Star
 Won four championship as a playing coach in 1986 Open Conference, 1988 All-Filipino Conference, 1991 First Conference and 1997 Commissioner's Cup all with the Ginebra franchise
 Coached the 1990 PBA All-Star Veterans, 1991 PBA All-Star Dark Team, 1992 PBA All-Star North Team, 1996 PBA All-Star Rookie/Sophomore/Juniors, and 1997 PBA All-Star Veterans
 Finished his PBA career with 5,825 career assists, 605 more than the running total of Ramon Fernandez.
 Member, 1966 Asian Games
 Member, 1967 Asian Basketball Confederation (Champions)
 Member, 1968 Olympic Games
 Member, 1969 Asian Basketball Confederation (Third Place)
 Member, team captain 1971 Asian Basketball Confederation (Second Place)
 Member, 1973 Asian Basketball Confederation (Champions),
 Member, 1974 World Championship
 Member, team captain, 1974 Asian Games
 Head Coach, 1990 Asian Games (Silver Medal)

Jaworski was the team captain of the 1971 team (2nd placer in the 1971 ABC in Tokyo) and 1974 RP team form the Asian Games (4th place)

References

External links
 
Senator Robert Jaworski, Senator Robert Jaworski's homepage
Robert Jaworski, Senate biography
Robert Jaworski article
Jaworski-Fernandez 1989 team-up 1989 All-Star Game that ended the Jaworski-Fernandez Feud

1946 births
Living people
Asian Games medalists in basketball
Asian Games silver medalists for the Philippines
Barangay Ginebra San Miguel players
Basketball players at the 1966 Asian Games
Basketball players at the 1968 Summer Olympics
Basketball players at the 1970 Asian Games
Basketball players at the 1974 Asian Games
Basketball players from Benguet
Filipino men's basketball coaches
Filipino people of American descent
Filipino people of Polish descent
Filipino sportsperson-politicians
Medalists at the 1990 Asian Games
Olympic basketball players of the Philippines
Barangay Ginebra San Miguel coaches
Philippine Basketball Association players with retired numbers
Philippines men's national basketball team players
Filipino men's basketball players
1974 FIBA World Championship players
Philippines men's national basketball team coaches
Player-coaches
Point guards
Senators of the 12th Congress of the Philippines
Senators of the 11th Congress of the Philippines
Sportspeople from Baguio
Toyota Super Corollas players
UE Red Warriors basketball players
Philippine Basketball Association All-Stars